Bisaltes montevidensis is a species of beetle in the family Cerambycidae. It was described by James Thomson in 1868. It is named after the city of Montevideo, Uruguay.

References

montevidensis
Beetles described in 1868